Michael Daniel Ambatchew (1967-2012) was an Ethiopian children's book writer. He has written Sidama Tales and Alemayehu. Although an admirer of Western stories like Puss in Boots, he has been active in improving the publishing of a more native Ethiopian children's literature, and has also written on literature in general.

A beloved father and family member, his literature is known to be humorous and a joy to read.

Life and career
Michael was born in Moscow to an Ethiopian father and an Indian mother He attended Addis Ababa University, earning a Bachelor of Arts degree in 1987.

Selected works

Books

 Animal Tales of Sidama (1998)
 Bongani in Addis (1998)
 A Cluster of Rejections (1999)
 Alemayehu (2006)
 Mimi Mystery (2012)

External links
British Council
Sankofa
Obituary 
Little Hands Books Live Interview

Ethiopian children's writers
1967 births
2012 deaths
20th-century Ethiopian writers
21st-century Ethiopian writers